Ingrid Moe Wold (born 29 January 1990) is a Norwegian former professional footballer who last played as a defender for Women's Super League side Everton and the Norway women's national team.

Club career

LSK Kvinner
Moe Wold joined Norwegian club LSK Kvinner in 2009. Over ten years at the club, she played 283 games in all competitions, scoring 38 goals and being appointed captain. In December 2019, it was announced that she's leaving the club, for the opportunity to play overseas.

Madrid CFF
In January 2020, Moe Wold joined Spanish club Madrid CFF. Following a season which was halted due to the COVID-19 pandemic in Spain, Moe Wold was released by the club, along with 11 other players, in June 2020.

Everton
In July 2020, Moe Wold joined Everton on a two-year deal. She made her debut in Everton's first game of the season, a 4–0 victory over Bristol City. In May 2021, Moe Wold announced that she will retire at the end of the 2020–21 FA WSL season, to pursue a career in physiotherapy.

International career
Moe Wold made her senior debut for Norway in 2012. She played in the 2015 and 2019 FIFA Women's World Cups and the UEFA Women's Euro 2017.  She played her final game for Norway 15 June 2021 vs. The Netherlands.

Career statistics

Honours
LSK Kvinner FK
 Toppserien (7): 2012, 2014, 2015, 2016, 2017, 2018, 2019
 Norwegian Women's Cup (5): 2014, 2015, 2016, 2018, 2019

References

External links

 
 Profile at Football Association of Norway 

1990 births
Living people
Women's association football defenders
Norwegian women's footballers
Norway women's international footballers
2015 FIFA Women's World Cup players
2019 FIFA Women's World Cup players
Toppserien players
Primera División (women) players
Women's Super League players
LSK Kvinner FK players
Madrid CFF players
Everton F.C. (women) players
Norwegian expatriate sportspeople in England
Norwegian expatriate sportspeople in Spain
Norwegian expatriate women's footballers
Expatriate women's footballers in Spain
Expatriate women's footballers in England
UEFA Women's Euro 2017 players